Leytmotif Luzifer (The 7 Temptations of Man) is the ninth studio album by Austrian black metal band Abigor. It was released on 18 July 2014.

Track listing

Credits 
 P.K. (Virus 666, Peter Kubik) – Guitars
 T.T. (Thomas Tannenberger) – Guitars, Drums, Bass
 Silenius – Vocals 
 Protector – Vocals (backing)

External links 
 Leytmotif Luzifer at metal-archives.com

2014 albums
Abigor albums
Avantgarde Music albums